Patronite is the vanadium sulfide mineral with formula VS4.  The material is usually described as V4+(S22−)2.  Structurally, it is a "linear-chain" compound with alternating bonding and nonbonding contacts between the vanadium centers.  The vanadium is octa-coordinated, which is an uncommon geometry for this metal.

The mineral was first described in 1906 for an occurrence in the Minas Ragra vanadium mine near Junín, Cerro de Pasco, Peru. It was named for Peruvian metallurgist Antenor Rizo-Patron (1866–1948) the discoverer of the deposit. At the type locality in Peru it occurs in fissures within a red shale likely derived from an asphaltum deposit. Associated minerals include, native sulfur, bravoite, pyrite, minasragrite, stanleyite, dwornikite, quartz and vanadium bearing lignite. It has also been reported from the Yushkinite gorge on the Middle Silova-Yakha River on the Paikhoi Range of the polar Urals of Russia and from the Tsumeb mine in Namibia.

References

Vanadium minerals
Sulfide minerals
Monoclinic minerals
Disulfides